Women's colleges in higher education are undergraduate, bachelor's degree-granting institutions, often liberal arts colleges, whose student populations are composed exclusively or almost exclusively of women. Some women's colleges admit male students to their graduate schools or in smaller numbers to undergraduate programs, but all serve a primarily female student body.

Distinction from finishing school
A women's college offers an academic curriculum exclusively or primarily, while a girls' or women's finishing school (sometimes called a charm school) focuses on social graces such as deportment, etiquette, and entertaining; academics if offered are secondary.

The term finishing school has sometimes been used or misused to describe certain women's colleges. Some of these colleges may have started as finishing schools but transformed themselves into rigorous liberal arts academic institutions, as for instance the now defunct Finch College. Likewise the secondary school Miss Porter's School was founded as Miss Porter's Finishing School for Young Ladies in 1843; now it emphasizes an academic curriculum.

A women's college that had never described itself as a finishing school can acquire the misnomer. Throughout the 114-year history of the women's college Sweet Briar, students and alumnae have objected to calling it a finishing school. Nonetheless the finishing school characterization persisted, and may have contributed to declining enrollment, financial straits, and the school's near closure in 2015.

Declining number
The continuing relevance of women's colleges has been questioned. While fifty years ago there were 240 women's colleges in the U.S., only about 40 now remain. In the words of a teacher at Radcliffe (a women's college that merged with Harvard): "[i]f women’s colleges become unnecessary, if women’s colleges become irrelevant, then that’s a sign of our [women's] success."

Around the world

Africa
Somaliland
 Barwaaqo University, Baliga Cas (estd. 2017)

Sudan
 Ahfad University for Women

Asia

Asian University for Women, Chittagong, Bangladesh (estd. 2008)
Bethune College, the first women's college in South Asia (estd. 1879)
Duksung Women's University in Seoul, South Korea. (estd. 1920)
Dongduk Women's University in Seoul, South Korea. (estd. 1950)
Ewha Womans University in Seoul, South Korea. (estd. 1886)
Indraprastha College for Women, Delhi (estd. 1924)
Jinnah University for Women, Karachi, Pakistan (estd. 1998)
Keisen University in Japan (estd. 1988)
Lady Irwin College, New Delhi (estd. 1932)
Lahore College for Women University in Pakistan (estd. 1922)
Miranda House, New Delhi (estd. 1948)
Women's College, Aligarh, India (estd. 1906)

Philippines
Assumption College San Lorenzo, Makati City (estd. 1959)
Miriam College in Quezon City (estd. 1926)
Philippine Women's University, the first women's university in the Philippines and Asia (estd. 1919)
St. Paul University Manila (estd. 1912)
St. Scholastica's College Manila (estd. 1906)

South Korea 
Seoul Women's University in Seoul, South Korea (estd. 1961)
Sookmyung Women's University in Seoul, South Korea (estd. 1906)
Sungshin Women's University in Seoul, South Korea. (estd. 1936)

Canada
Brescia University College is Canada's only extant university-level women's educational institution. Brescia is affiliated with and located on the campus of the University of Western Ontario in London, Ontario.

Mount Saint Vincent University in Halifax, Nova Scotia was originally founded as a women's college in 1875, but became co-educational in 1967.

Middle East
Kingdom of Bahrain
 Royal University for Women

United Arab Emirates
 Dubai Women's College

Kuwait
 Box Hill College Kuwait
 College for Women, a separate faculty at Kuwait University

Kingdom of Saudi Arabia
Most major universities in Kingdom of Saudi Arabia are composed of two branches: a women-only branch and a similar male-only branch. This includes the following universities:
 King Saud University
 Al-Imam University
 King Abdulaziz University
 King Faisal University
 Prince Sultan University
The following are female-only institutions:
 Effat University
 Princess Noura University

Iran
 Alzahra University, Tehran

United Kingdom

Mary Astell advocated the idea that women were just as rational as men, and just as deserving of education. First published in 1694, her Serious Proposal to the Ladies for the Advancement of their True and Greatest Interest presents a plan for an all-female college where women could pursue a life of the mind. The first college to partially realise Astell's plan was Whitelands College, a women's teacher training college opened in 1841 by the Church of England's National Society and since 2004 part of the University of Roehampton. Whitelands was followed by two colleges in London, Queen's College in 1848 and Bedford College in 1849. Queen's College developed into a girls' public school and Bedford College became part of the University of London before merging with another women's college. The first of the Cambridge women's colleges, Girton, which opened in 1869 initially in Hitchin, claims to be the first residential college in Britain to offer degree level education to women. Somerville and Lady Margaret Hall in Oxford opened in 1879.

Existing women's colleges:

 Murray Edwards College, Cambridge (established 1954, formerly New Hall)
 Newnham College, Cambridge (established 1871)

Former women's colleges:

 Bedford College, London (established 1849, became co-educational 1965)
 Bishop Otter College, now University of Chichester (established 1873, became co-educational 1957)
 Digby Stuart College, Roehampton University (established 1874, became co-educational 1971)
 Froebel College, Roehampton University (established 1892, became co-educational 1965)
 Girton College, Cambridge (established 1869, became co-educational 1976)
 Hughes Hall, Cambridge (established 1885, became co-educational 1973)
 Lady Margaret Hall, Oxford (established 1878, became co-educational 1979)
 Royal Holloway, University of London (established 1879, became co-educational 1965)
 St Aidan's College, Durham (established 1947, became co-educational 1981)
 St Anne's College, Oxford (established 1879, became co-educational 1979)
 St Hild's College, Durham (established 1858, merged to form co-educational college 1975)
 St Hilda's College, Oxford (established 1893, became co-educational 2008)
 St Hugh's College, Oxford (established 1886, became co-educational 1986)
 St Mary's College, Durham (established 1899, became co-educational 2005)
 Somerville College, Oxford (established 1879, became co-educational 1994)
 Southlands College, Roehampton University (established 1872, became co-educational 1965)
 Trevelyan College, Durham (established 1966, became co-educational 1992)
 Westfield College, London (established 1882, became co-educational 1964)
 Whitelands College, Roehampton University (established 1841, became co-educational 1965)
 Lucy Cavendish College, Cambridge (established 1965, became co-educational in 2020)

United States

Early history

Women's colleges in the United States were a product of the increasingly popular private girls' secondary schools of the early- to mid-19th century, called "academies" or "seminaries." According to Irene Harwarth, et al., "women's colleges were founded during the mid- and late-19th century in response to a need for advanced education for women at a time when they were not admitted to most institutions of higher education." While there were a few coeducational colleges (such as Oberlin College founded in 1833, Lawrence University in 1847, Antioch College in 1853, and Bates College in 1855), most colleges and universities of high standing at that time were exclusively for men.

Critics of the girls’ seminaries were roughly divided into two groups. The reform group, including Emma Willard, felt seminaries required reform through “strengthening teaching of the core academic subjects.” Others felt seminaries were insufficient, suggesting “a more durable institution--a women’s college--be founded, among them, Catharine E. Beecher. In her True Remedy for the Wrongs of Women (1851), Beecher points out how “seminaries could not offer sufficient, permanent endowments, buildings, and libraries; a corporation whose duty it is to perpetuate the institution on a given plan.”

Another notable figure was Mary Lyon (1797-1849), founder of Mount Holyoke College, whose contemporaries included Sarah Pierce (Litchfield Female Academy, 1792); Catharine Beecher (Hartford Female Seminary, 1823); Zilpah P. Grant Banister (Ipswich Female Seminary, 1828); George Washington Doane (St. Mary's Hall, 1837 now called Doane Academy). Prior to founding Mount Holyoke, Lyon contributed to the development of both Hartford Female Seminary and Ipswich Female Seminary. She was also involved in the creation of Wheaton Female Seminary (now Wheaton College, Massachusetts) in 1834.

Women's College Coalition
The Women's College Coalition is an association of women's colleges and universities (with some observers/participants from the single-sex secondary/high schools) that are either two- and four-year, both public and private, religiously-affiliated and secular. It was founded in 1972, at a time in which the "Civil Rights Movement", the "Women's Rights Movement", and Title IX, as well as demographic and technological changes in the 1960s brought about rapid and complex social and economic change in the United States. These societal changes put increasing pressure of perceived "unpopularity" and "old fashioned" perceptions and opinions placing the concept of "single-sex education" for both women and men on the most drastic downward spiral in its history. Additionally, the landscape of education dramatically changed as many previously all-male high schools (both private/independent and public) along with the colleges, many of which were either forced by official actions or declining attendance figures to become coeducational, thereby offering women many more educational options. At the same time with the similar changes forced on women's institutions, both private and public secondary schools along with the colleges/universities, forced a number of the larger number of girls schools to also coeducate. By the late 1970s, women's enrollment in college exceeded the men's and, today, women make up the majority of undergraduates (57% nationally) on college/university campuses. Women earn better college grades than men do, and are more likely than men to complete college.

During the past several years, the Women's College Coalition engaged in research about the benefits of a women's high school and/or college education in the 21st Century. Drawing upon the findings of research conducted by the National Survey of Student Engagement (NSSE) and Hardwick-Day on levels of satisfaction among students and alumnae at women's colleges and coeducational institutions, as well as the Association of American Colleges and Universities, NAICU and others, the Coalition makes the case for women's education and women's high schools and colleges to prospective students, families, policy and opinion makers, the media, employers and the general public.

Women's colleges and universities in North America

 Agnes Scott College
 Alverno College
 Barnard College
 Bay Path University
 Bennett College for Women
 Brenau University
 Brescia University College
 Bryn Mawr College
 Cedar Crest College
 College of Saint Benedict
 Cottey College
 Douglass Residential College of Rutgers University, (the State University of New Jersey)
 Hollins University
 Mary Baldwin University
 Meredith College
 Moore College of Art and Design
 Mount Holyoke College
 Mount Mary College
 Mount St. Mary's College
 Notre Dame of Maryland University, (formerly College of Notre Dame of Maryland)
 St. Catherine University
 Saint Mary's College (Indiana)
 Salem College
 Scripps College
 Simmons College
 Smith College
 Spelman College
 Stephens College
 Sweet Briar College
 Trinity Washington University
 Ursuline College
 Wellesley College
 Wesleyan College
 The Women's College of the University of Denver

See also
Gaudy Night
Men's college
Men's colleges in the United States
Mixed-sex education
Single-sex education

References

External links
Hands off women's colleges, say Oxbridge students
What are Girls Colleges made of? - Deepti Priya Mehrotra, boloji.com
When women don't talk ... - Jaya Indiresan, The Hindu Business Line
Women's College Leaders From Around the Globe Meet to Discuss "Women's Hopes and Dreams"
US News&World Report Rankings

 
College